Scott Campbell (born 22 January 1972) is a Scottish retired ice hockey defenceman.

Career 
Campbell twice won the BH Cup; first as a member of the 1996–97 Sheffield Steelers (who were also the BISL Playoff Champions), and again as a member of the 1997-98 Bracknell Bees. As a member of the  2001–02 Guildford Flames, Campbell captured both the BNL Championship and the BNL Playoff Championship.

Campbell competed as a member of the Great Britain men's national ice hockey team at both the 2002 and 2003 Men's World Ice Hockey Championships.

He later worked as a coach in Canadian college hockey with the Ontario Tech Ridgebacks.

Career statistics

References

External links

1972 births
Living people
Ayr Scottish Eagles players
Bracknell Bees players
Brantford Smoke players
Cape Breton Oilers players
Charlotte Checkers (1993–2010) players
Courmaosta HC players
Dundee Stars players
Fife Flyers players
Guildford Flames players
HC Merano players
London Knights (UK) players
Manchester Storm (1995–2002) players
Muskegon Fury players
Newcastle Vipers players
Newcastle Warriors players
Niagara Falls Thunder players
Peterborough Petes (ice hockey) players
Rochester Americans players
Scottish ice hockey defencemen
Sheffield Steelers players
Toledo Storm players
Scottish emigrants to Canada
Canadian ice hockey defencemen
British expatriate ice hockey people
Canadian expatriate ice hockey players in the United States
Scottish expatriate sportspeople in the United States
Canadian expatriate ice hockey players in Italy
Scottish expatriate sportspeople in Italy
Canadian ice hockey coaches
Sportspeople from Glasgow